The Ride is a documentary on professional bull riding.  It was produced by Vice Media and directed by Meredith Danluck, after originally being created for VBS.tv. It premiered at the SXSW Film Festival in 2010.

Synopsis
With event footage, bull riding, pyrotechnics, and big arena rock and roll, The Ride goes through the lives of professional cowboys on the Professional Bull Riders' circuit. The circuit is a tour of the top 45 bull riders in the world, consisting of roughly 32 stops a year around the US. The winner of the world title in Vegas also wins a million dollars.

Cast
J.B. Mauney - professional bull rider
Willy Ropp - Amish bull rider
Flint Rasmussen - PBR entertainer 
Shorty Gorham - bull fighter 
Leann Hart - singer songwriter 
Tom Teague - millionaire bucking bull breeder

Production
Filmed in Spring of 2008, it has an original score by Brooklyn band The Weight. Director Meredith Danluck and DP Jake Burghart both previously worked on the VBS.tv showcase entitled Toxic Garbage Island. It was produced by VICE Films as a presentation of a Jeff Yapp production.

Release, reception
It premiered in March 2010 at the SXSW Film Festival. According to a review in the Austinist, "People are the soul of a well-told story and Danluck is enamored with her down-home characters at the expense of a deeper look at the sport, its history and rules. Danluck’s not-quite-novel glimpses into rural southern culture eclipse the beautifully shot ringside action. She’s hooked on the rugged romance of cowboydom, from cattle to Coors, and less transfixed by the intricacies that lead these people into the bull’s eye."

References

External links
TheRideFilm.com

American documentary films
Vice Films films
Rodeo in film
Cowboy culture
2010s English-language films
2010s American films